The Fall 2021 Chattanooga FC season is the club's third professional season playing in the National Independent Soccer Association and 14th overall since being established in 2009.

Roster

Players

Technical staff

Transfers

Out

Out

Friendlies

Competitions

NISA Independent Cup 

Details for the 2021 NISA Independent Cup were released on June 10. Chattanooga were placed in the Southeast Region for the second straight year along with three United Premier Soccer League teams; Savannah Clovers FC, Soda City FC (both of which took part in the 2020 edition), and 2020 Fall UPSL Champion Atletico Atlanta.

Chattanooga won the regional title for a second straight season after two matches following a win at Savanah and a tie between Soda City and Atlanta.

Standings

Matches

National Independent Soccer Association season 

Details regarding the Fall season were released on June 16.

Standings

Results summary

Matches

Squad statistics

Appearances and goals 

|-
! colspan="14" style="background:#dcdcdc; text-align:center"| Goalkeepers

|-
! colspan="18" style="background:#dcdcdc; text-align:center"| Defenders

|-
! colspan="18" style="background:#dcdcdc; text-align:center"| Midfielders

|-
! colspan="18" style="background:#dcdcdc; text-align:center"| Forwards

|-
|}

Goal scorers

Disciplinary record

References 

Chattanooga FC
Chattanooga FC